Frederick Cheshire (24 September 1901 – 12 October 1956) was a South African cricketer. He played in seven first-class matches for Border from 1923/24 to 1929/30.

See also
 List of Border representative cricketers

References

External links
 

1901 births
1956 deaths
South African cricketers
Border cricketers
People from Queenstown, South Africa
Cricketers from the Eastern Cape